(or Kitasenchi Station) is a railway station on the Tokyu Oimachi Line in Ota, Tokyo, Japan, operated by the private railway operator Tokyu Corporation.

Station layout
The station consists of a ground-level island platform serving two tracks.

History
May 21, 1930: Renamed .
January 1, 1936: Changed its name into the present name.

Bus services
 Kita-Senzoku 2-chome bus stop (Tokyu Bus)

References

Railway stations in Tokyo
Railway stations in Japan opened in 1928
Tokyu Oimachi Line
Stations of Tokyu Corporation